Thomas Fleetwood may refer to:

Thomas Fleetwood (of the Vache) (1518–1570), Master of the Mint, MP for Preston and Buckinghamshire
Thomas Fleetwood (1661–1717), British landowner, and drainer of Martin Mere
Sir Thomas Fleetwood, 2nd Baronet (1609–1670), of the Fleetwood baronets
Sir Thomas Fleetwood, attorney general to Prince Henry, son of James I, of the Fleetwood baronets

See also 
Tommy Fleetwood (born 1991), golfer
Tom Fleetwood (1888–?), English footballer